McCanna is an album by pianist Les McCann recorded in 1964 and released on the Pacific Jazz label.

Reception

Allmusic gives the album 3 stars.

Track listing 
All compositions by Les McCann except as indicated
 "McCanna" - 4:32
 "St. James Infirmary" (Joe Primrose) - 3:58
 "It Had Better Be Tonight" (Henry Mancini, Johnny Mercer) - 3:45
 "Que Rico" (Ralph Dollimore) - 2:45
 "Zulu" - 2:25
 "Basuto Baby" - 3:03
 "Falling in Love with Love" (Richard Rodgers, Lorenz Hart) - 5:55
 "Narobi Nights" - 4:46
 "Shaam-Pu II" - 3:37

Personnel 
Les McCann - piano
Victor Gaskin - bass
Paul Humphrey - drums
Willie Correa - bongos, congas, timbales

References 

Les McCann albums
1964 albums
Pacific Jazz Records albums